At Sachem Farm (also known as Higher Love, Trade Winds and Uncorked) is a 1998 drama film directed by John Huddles and starring Minnie Driver and Rufus Sewell.

Cast
Minnie Driver
Rufus Sewell
Nigel Hawthorne
Amelia Heinle
Michael E. Rodgers
Keone Young
Gregory Sporleder
Chalvay Srichoom
Elizabeth Tsing
Jim Beaver
Greg Grunberg
Minja Filipovic

References

External links

Films about wine
1998 films
1990s English-language films
1998 drama films
American drama films
Films scored by Jeff Danna
1990s American films